This is a list of notable people who were born in, or have lived in El Paso, Texas.

Politics, military, and government

Shirley "S.L." Abbott, Texas legislator and United States Ambassador
Lucy G. Acosta (1926-2008), activist and political appointee.
Oscar Zeta Acosta, attorney, writer
Suzie Azar (born 1946), aviator, politician and first woman to serve as mayor of El Paso.
Jeff Bingaman, former United States Senator
Beau Boulter, politician
Omar Bradley, Five Star General, first Chairman of the Joint Chiefs of Staff
Wernher von Braun, German Nazi rocket scientist
Cornell William Brooks (born 1961), president of the NAACP
Kathleen Cardone (born 1953), United States District Judge.
Alicia R. Chacón (born 1938), first woman elected to office in the city of El Paso.
Ann Day, politician
Veronica Escobar, United States Representative.
Albert Bacon Fall, politician
Patrick G. Forrester, astronaut
Mary González (born 1983), state representative.
Ambrosio Guillen, Medal of Honor recipient
Polly Harris (1924-1987), politician and theater enthusiast
Victoriano Huerta, former President of Mexico
Shoshana Johnson, POW
Wayne Harold Johnson, Republican member of both houses, consecutively, of the Wyoming State Legislature from 1993 to 2017; born in El Paso in 1942
 Charles S. Kilburn. U.S. Army brigadier general
Octaviano Ambrosio Larrazolo, politician
Thomas Calloway Lea Jr., attorney, judge, Mayor of El Paso (1915–1917)
Barbara Lee, member of the United States House of Representatives
Oscar Leeser, Mayor of El Paso
Virginia B. MacDonald, Illinois state legislator
Adair Margo, Chairman, President's Committee on the Arts and Humanities
Susana Martinez, former Governor of New Mexico
Anson Mills, brigadier general, platted El Paso in 1859.
Sandra Day O'Connor, Associate Justice of the Supreme Court of the United States. First woman to serve on the Supreme Court.
John "Danny" Olivas, astronaut
Beto O'Rourke, former member of the United States House of Representatives
John "Black Jack" Pershing, General of the Armies
Joseph C. Rodriguez, Medal of Honor recipient
Paul Ray Smith, Medal of Honor recipient
 Gabe Vasquez, member of the United States House of Representatives
Jack Vowell, Republican member of the Texas House of Representatives from 1981 to 1995; construction company president in El Paso
Richard C. White, member of the United States House of Representatives, WWII veteran, Marine
Myra Carroll Winkler (1880-1963), first woman to hold elected office in El Paso County.

Western history

 George Campbell, ex-El Paso marshal
 Albert Jennings Fountain, Wild West Indian fighter, politician
Henry O. Flipper (1856-1940), Buffalo soldier and first African American graduate of West Point.
 Pat Garrett, Western law man known for killing Billy The Kid
 John Wesley Hardin, outlaw, attorney and gunfighter in late 19th-century Texas
 Gus Krempkau, El Paso County constable
 Pascual Orozco, Mexican revolutionary leader
 George Scarborough, U.S. Marshal, gunfighter, outlaw
 John Selman, El Paso County constable, cattle rustler and outlaw
 Dallas Stoudenmire, El Paso Town Marshal and U.S. Marshal
 Pancho Villa, Revolutionary general of the Mexican Revolution, Centaur of the North (Centaurio del Norte)
Florida J. Wolfe (1867-1913), socialite, cattle rancher and philanthropist.

Film

 F. Murray Abraham, Academy Award-winning actor
 Billy Blair, actor
 Don Bluth, animator and director
 Lombardo Boyar, actor
 Thomas Haden Church, Academy Award-nominated actor
 Norma Crane, film actress known for her role as "Golde" in the 1971 film adaptation of Fiddler on the Roof
 Judith Ivey, Tony Award-winning actress
 Guy Kibbee, actor
 Rudy Larriva, animator and director
 Laura Martinez Herring, Miss Texas USA 1985, Miss USA 1985 and actress, Mulholland Drive
 John Cameron Mitchell, actor, director, songwriter, Hedwig and the Angry Inch
 Lupe Ontiveros, actress
 Anthony Quinn, Academy Award-winning actor
 Debbie Reynolds, Academy Award-nominated actress, Singin' in the Rain
 Lynne Roberts, actress
 Gilbert Roland, Golden Globe-nominated actor
 Steven Sills, screenwriter
 Octavio Solis, actor
 Sharon Tate, actress, Valley of the Dolls
 Alan Tudyk, actor
 Hal Warren, writer and director of Manos: The Hands of Fate, widely regarded as one of the worst movies ever made

Television

 Ana Alicia, actress
Estela Casas (born 1961), news anchor
 Ara Celi, actress
 Lydia Cornell, actress, model, comedian, novelist
 Sam Donaldson, television journalist
 Stephen Espinoza, television executive 
 Alana de la Garza, actress
 Vickie Guerrero, actress
 Jack Handey, comedy writer and author
 Sherman Hemsley, television actor, The Jeffersons
 Jordan Hinson, actress
 Elisa Jimenez, designer
 Bill Macatee, sportscaster
 Karla Martinez, television personality
 Lupe Ontiveros, actress
 Gene Roddenberry, Star Trek creator and television producer
 Irene Ryan, actress, The Beverly Hillbillies
 Aarón Sanchez, chef
 Octavio Solis
 Nora Zehetner, actress

Literature 

 Paco Ahlgren, writer
 Alicia Gaspar de Alba, writer, poet, scholar
Kathleen Barber, writer
Cynthia Farah (born 1949), photographer and writer
Marcia Hatfield Daudistel, writer.
Daniel Edison, writer, intellectual historian.
 Shanaya Fastje, author, singer, songwriter, actress and speaker
 Betty J. Ligon (1921-2015), journalist
Sheryl Luna, poet.
 Cormac McCarthy, novelist
 Aileen Mehle, gossip columnist
 Leon Claire Metz, author, writer, historian, television and radio personality, public speaker and story teller
 Pat Mora, author
 Michael Petry, artist, author 
 Estela Portillo-Trambley, poet
 John Rechy, author
 Benjamin Alire Sáenz, writer, poet
 Rubén Salazar, journalist
 Robert Skimin, author
 Sergio Troncoso, author
Janice Woods Windle (born 1938), novelist
 Angelina Virginia Winkler, journalist, editor, magazine publisher

Visual arts 

 Manuel Gregorio Acosta, artist
 Ho Baron, sculptor
 Kate Moore Brown (1871-1945), clubwoman and creator of the International Museum of Art in El Paso.
 Mago Orona Gándara (1929-2018), Chicana artist and muralist
 Joe Allen Hong, fashion designer, artist
Anna Jaquez (born 1953), artist and metalsmith
Luis Jiménez, fiberglass artist
Tom Lea, artist, war correspondent, novelist, historian
 Tom Moore, cartoonist, Archie comics
 Gloria Osuna Perez (1947-1999), Chicana artist
 Becky Duval Reese, art curator and former director of the El Paso Museum of Art
 Urbici Soler, artist

Music, performing arts and stage

 Birdie Alexander (1870-1960), musician and educator
 Blake Allen, composer and musician
 At the Drive-In, alternative rock band
 Clint Ballard Jr., musician
 Cedric Bixler-Zavala, musician
 Jimmy Carl Black, musician
Malena Cano, ranchero and mariachi singer
 Vikki Carr, Grammy-winning international singer, entertainer
 The Chamanas, Latin Grammy nominee, border music band
 Adam Duritz, musician
 Emcee N.I.C.E., hip-hop recording artist
 Bobby Fuller, musician
 Kenneth James Gibson, musician, record producer  
 Rosa Ramirez Guerrero (born 1934), educator and dancer
 Gunplay, rapper
 Ingeborg Heuser, dancer and choreographer
 Al Jourgensen, musician, music producer
 Khalid, singer-songwriter
 Ronn Lucas, ventriloquist, comedian
 Terry Manning, music producer, audio engineer, photographer
 The Mars Volta, progressive rock band
 John Moyer, musician, bass player for Disturbed
 Stevie Nicks, musician
 Drusilla Nixon, music educator, civil rights activist, and community advocate 
 Salim Nourallah, musician
 Phil Ochs, musician
 Pissing Razors, groove metal band
Jiles Perry Richardson, musician also known as The Big Bopper
Joan H. Quarm (1920-2010), American educator, actor, and theater director
Riot Ten, DJ and producer
 Omar Rodríguez-López, musician
 The Royalty, musical group
 Tom Russell, singer-songwriter
 Irene Ryan, actress and entertainer
 Freddy Soto, comedian
 Sparta, musical group
 Ryan Stout, comedian
 Don Tosti, Mexican American composer, bandleader and musician
 Jim Ward, musician
 Todd Womack, comedian

Sports

Keitha Adams (born 1967), basketball coach
Kristi Albers (born 1963), professional golfer
Nate Archibald, basketball player
 Jerry D. Bailey, jockey
 Cesar Bazan, boxer
 Bob Beamon, Olympic champion long jumper
 Rich Beem, professional golfer
 Sin Cara, WWE wrestler
 Fred Carr, NFL player, Green Bay Packers Hall of Fame inductee
 Frank Castillo, baseball player
 Andy Cohen, Major League Baseball second baseman and coach
 Randall "Tex" Cobb, boxer
 Alan Culpepper, Olympic runner
 Christian Cunningham (born 1997), basketball player in the Israeli Basketball Premier League
 Mark Dantonio, college football coach
 Billy Davis, NFL player, two-time Super Bowl champion
 Jamie Dick, NASCAR driver
 Manny Fernandez, wrestler
 Tim Floyd, basketball coach
 James Forbes, basketball player
 Greg Foster, basketball player
 Mark Grudzielanek, baseball player
 Chavo Guerrero Sr., professional wrestler
 Chavo Guerrero Jr., professional wrestler
 Eddie Guerrero, professional wrestler former WWE Champion
 Vickie Guerrero professional wrestling personality for WWE
 Don Haskins, basketball coach, Naismith Basketball Hall of Fame inductee
 J. P. Hayes, professional golfer
 Tuff Hedeman, rodeo performer
 Butch Henry, baseball pitcher and Minor League manager
 Bruce Holmes, football player
 Chris Jacke, NFL player, Green Bay Packers Hall of Fame inductee
 Marcell Jacobs, Olympic sprinter
 Aaron Jones, NFL player
 Shawn Jordan, LSU Football Champion, UFC Fighter 
 Seth Joyner, professional football player
 Juan Lazcano, boxer
 Nik Lentz, mixed martial artist
 Marshall Leonard, professional soccer player
 Will Licon, swimmer
 Don Maynard, professional football player
 Taj McWilliams-Franklin, professional basketball player
 Ray Mickens, professional football player
 Ricardo Pepi, professional soccer player
 Danny Perez, professional baseball player
 Mike Price, college football coach
 Omar Quintanilla, professional baseball player
 Nolan Richardson, basketball coach
 David Rodriguez professional boxer 
Sandra Rushing, basketball coach
 Omar Salgado, professional soccer player
 Dick Savitt, professional tennis player
 Willie Shoemaker, jockey
 John Skelton, NFL quarterback
 Paul Smith, football player
 Paul Stankowski, professional golfer
 Ed Stansbury, NFL player
 Reece "Goose" Tatum, professional basketball player
 Kenny Thomas, professional basketball player
 Tony Tolbert, professional American footballer
 Lee Trevino, professional golfer
 Austin Trout, professional boxer
 Jesse Whittenton, NFL player, Green Bay Packers Hall of Fame inductee
 Brian Young, football player
 Jake Young, football player
 Alan Zinter, baseball player and coach

Educators and librarians 

Blanca Enriquez, educator and director of Head Start
Betty Mary Goetting (1897-1980), librarian and activist
Olga Bernstein Kohlberg (1864-1935), philanthropist and founder of first public kindergarten in Texas
Dionne Mack (born 1973), librarian and deputy city manager
 Francis Joseph Mullin, president of Shimer College
 Diana Natalicio (born 1939), first woman to serve as president of UTEP
Mary Irene Stanton (1862-1946), founder of the El Paso Public Library
Maud Durlin Sullivan (1870-1943), librarian at the El Paso Public Library
Josefina Villamil Tinajero, bilingual educator
 María Guillermina Valdes Villalva (1939-1991), scholar and educator
 Kimie Yanagawa (1915-1997), educator and first Japanese person naturalized in the United States

Video Games
 Don Bluth, animator and director; co-creator of Dragon's Lair
 Rawson Stovall, video game producer/designer, author, and first nationally syndicated reviewer of video games

Others
Jay J. Armes, private investigator
Josephine Clardy Fox (1881-1971), businesswoman and philanthropist.
Christine Gonzalez, train engineer
 Fred Imus, radio personality, brother of Don Imus
Peter E. Kern (1860-1937), real estate entrepreneur
Ruth Kern (1914-2002), lawyer
Ginger Kerrick, physicist
 Richard Ramirez, serial killer
 George Angel Rivas Jr., criminal, leader of the Texas Seven 
 Aaron Sanchez, chef
Eugenia Schuster (1865-1946), community activist
 Fannie S. Spitz, inventor
Ron Stallworth, police officer, subject of movie BlacKkKlansman
Leona Ford Washington (1928-2007), community activist and writer of the song, "The City of El Paso," El Paso's official song
Wulf Zendik, author, environmentalist, founder of Zendik Farm commune and art cooperative.

References

El Paso, Texas
El Paso